Per Harrysson (born 20 February 1967) is a Swedish former footballer who played as a forward.

References

1967 births
Living people
Swedish footballers
Association football forwards
Allsvenskan players
Superettan players
Malmö FF players
AIK Fotboll players
Landskrona BoIS players
Mjällby AIF players
Swedish football managers
IFK Malmö Fotboll managers